Matthew James Hedges (born April 1, 1990) is an American professional soccer player who plays as a center-back for Major League Soccer club Toronto FC.

Hedges has been considered one of the better defenders in MLS since 2014, landing on the MLS Best XI in 2015 and 2016, and winning the MLS Defender of the Year Award in 2016.

Career

College and amateur
Hedges was born in New York but grew up in Carmel, Indiana. He attended Carmel High School (Carmel, Indiana), where he was a member of the 2006 Greyhounds soccer team that went undefeated, and won both the IHSAA Boys' Soccer State Championship and the NSCAA National Championship. He played college soccer at Butler University between 2008 and 2010, and at the University of North Carolina in 2011. During his time at Butler, Hedges was named to the NSCAA All-America Second Team as a junior, and he was also named Horizon League Defender of the Year in both his junior and sophomore years. After transferring to North Carolina, he was named ACC Defensive Player of the Year and to the NSCAA All-America First Team. He scored 6 times on the season and helped lead the Tar Heels defense to a 0.69 goals-against average en route to the 2011 NCAA National Championship.

Hedges spent time with USL Premier Development League club Fort Wayne Fever in 2009, making 9 appearances. He also spent time with USL PDL club Reading United in 2010 and 2011, scoring 4 goals in 24 appearances.

Professional
FC Dallas selected Hedges in the first round (No. 11 overall) of the 2012 MLS SuperDraft. He made his professional debut on April 5, 2012, in a 1–0 victory against the New England Revolution. Due to injuries and his excellent play for a rookie, he became a regular starter for the club. His first goal in the 2014 season was a header in the 90th minute against Sporting Kansas City off a free kick taken by Michel. The goal tied the game, 1–1.

Hedges captained the team for the first time in 2014, a move that eventually became permanent. Since becoming captain, he has led the club into the MLS playoffs in 2014, 2015, and 2016. Also in 2015, the club was the Western Conference regular season champions and Supporters' Shield runner-up. For the 2015 MLS season, he was named to the Best XI and as a finalist for Defender of the Year. Dallas was even more successful in 2016, winning the Supporters' Shield and the Lamar Hunt U.S. Open Cup. Hedges was once again named to the Best XI and, this time, was the winner of the Defender of the Year award.

In 2020, he became the all-time leader in MLS appearances for FC Dallas, passing Jason Kreis.

In December 2022, he signed a two-year contract with Toronto FC beginning in the 2023 season.

International
Hedges made his United States men's national soccer team debut on February 8, 2015, when he came on as a substitute in the 72nd minute against Panama in a friendly. He was selected to the U.S. squad for the 2017 CONCACAF Gold Cup, which the U.S. ended up winning. Hedges started and played 90 minutes in victories over Martinique in group stage play and El Salvador in the quarterfinals.

Career statistics

Club

Honors 
University of North Carolina
NCAA National Champions: 2011

FC Dallas
U.S. Open Cup: 2016
Supporters' Shield: 2016

United States
CONCACAF Gold Cup: 2017

Individual
Horizon League Defender of the Year: 2009, 2010
ACC Defender of the Year: 2011
 NCAA 1st Team All America: 2011
MLS Best XI: 2015, 2016
MLS Defender of the Year: 2016
MLS All-Star: 2017, 2018, 2019

See also

 List of current Major League Soccer players with national team caps

References

External links
 
 
 University of North Carolina bio
 Soccerstats bio

1990 births
Living people
American soccer players
Butler Bulldogs men's soccer players
Carmel High School (Indiana) alumni
North Carolina Tar Heels men's soccer players
Reading United A.C. players
FC Dallas players
Association football defenders
Soccer players from New York (state)
USL League Two players
Major League Soccer players
Major League Soccer All-Stars
People from Carmel, Indiana
FC Dallas draft picks
United States men's international soccer players
2017 CONCACAF Gold Cup players
CONCACAF Gold Cup-winning players
All-American men's college soccer players
Toronto FC players